San Rafael de Velasco or San Rafael is the seat of the San Rafael Municipality in the José Miguel de Velasco Province, Santa Cruz Department, Bolivia. It is part of the Jesuit Missions of Chiquitos. In 1990 it was declared a World Heritage Site.

History
In 1695, the mission of San José was founded by Jesuit missionaries Juan Bautista Zea and Francisco Hervás. The mission was relocated and rebuilt multiple times due to epidemics (in 1701 and again in 1705) and fires (in 1719). In 1750, the mission was rebuilt yet again.

Languages
The Tao (Yúnkarirsh) dialect of Chiquitano was spoken in San Rafael.

Today, Camba Spanish, which has many words from Chiquitano, is spoken in San Rafael.

See also
 List of Jesuit sites
 List of the Jesuit Missions of Chiquitos

References

External links 
 Map of José Miguel de Velasco Province
 Description of the Jesuit mission (World Heritage Site) with pictures and information

Populated places in Santa Cruz Department (Bolivia)
Jesuit Missions of Chiquitos
Populated places established in 1695